Ablution is the act of washing oneself. It may refer to:

 Ablution as hygiene
 Ablution as ritual purification
 Ablution in Islam:
 Wudu, daily wash
 Ghusl, bathing ablution
 Tayammum, waterless ablution
 Ablution in Christianity
 Ritual washing in Judaism
 Ritual purification in Mandaeism
Rishama, daily ablution of face and limbs
Tamasha, full body purification
Masbuta, ritual immersion baptism purification
 Misogi, in Shinto
 Absolution, the washing away of sin

See also
 Oblation
 Ablation